{{DISPLAYTITLE:C39H53N9O14S}}
The molecular formula C39H53N9O14S (molar mass: 903.96 g/mol, exact mass: 903.3432 u) may refer to:

 Amanin
 epsilon-Amanitin

Molecular formulas